Joseph Dweck is the senior rabbi of the S&P Sephardi Community of the United Kingdom.

Biography
Rabbi Dweck is American born, of Syrian-Sephardi origin, and has lived in Los Angeles, California and Brooklyn, New York. He studied in Jerusalem at Hazon Ovadia Yeshiva under the tutelage of former Rishon LeZiyon, Sephardi Chief Rabbi of Israel Ovadia Yosef and his son, Rabbi Yitzhak Yosef, the current Rishon LeZiyon.

Rav Ovadia Yosef referred to Rabbi Dweck as his "heart's desire" and "the esteemed Rabbi who brings merit to the community" in an approbation written for Dweck's book on Jewish blessings, Birkhot Shamayim.

Rabbi Dweck received his semikha (rabbinic ordination) from Rav Ovadia Yosef under the auspices of the Sephardic Rabbinical College of Brooklyn, New York.

In 1995 he married Margalit Bar Shalom, daughter of Dayan Ezra Bar Shalom and Adina (Yosef) Bar Shalom, and
granddaughter of Rav Ovadia Yosef.

Rabbi Dweck studied for three years (1996–99) at the YULA Kollel in Los Angeles under Rabbi Nachum Sauer. In 1999 he moved with his wife and oldest son to Brooklyn, New York to become a fellow of the newly established Sephardic Rabbinical College under the direction of Rabbi Shimon Alouf, where he studied for the next seven years.

He also studied psychology and philosophy at Santa Monica College in Los Angeles and received a Bachelor of Science degree in Liberal Arts from Excelsior College in Albany, New York. He leans toward Rationalism. He received a Master of Arts Degree in Jewish Education from Middlesex University in collaboration with the London School of Jewish Studies.

Career 
Hazan (Cantor)

In his earlier years, Rabbi Dweck trained as a Hazan (cantor) in Israel under famed Hazan Moshe Habusha and later in Brooklyn, NY, under Rabbi Refael Elnadav. In 1999, he joined Sha’are Shalom, a Syrian synagogue in Brooklyn, NY as their Hazan.Community Rabbi

Shortly thereafter, he was asked to assume the position as rabbi of the congregation, a position he held for 15 years. Under his guidance, the synagogue flourished, as the original 50 members grew into over 350 families, with Rabbi Dweck deeply involved in all aspects of daily community life.

Teacher

Rabbi Dweck began his formal teaching career as a high school teacher of Jewish Law and Philosophy at Magen David Yeshiva in Brooklyn, New York where he taught for two years.

From 2005 to 2008, Rabbi Dweck taught Mishna at Barkai Yeshiva in Brooklyn, New York City. He assumed the role of Hebrew Principal in 2009, and later became Rosh Yeshiva/Head of School in 2010, a position he served for four years.

Head of School

Rabbi Dweck centred Barkai's core vision on the concept that “the Author of the Torah is the Author of the world”. As such, all students were taught the five books of the Torah, establishing a comprehensive framework of thought, with secular studies taught uncompromisingly through the lens of Torah. This encompassed all aspects throughout the curriculum, including art and physical education.

Head of S&P Sephardi Community

In 2013, Rabbi Dweck was appointed Senior Rabbi of the Spanish and Portuguese Jews’ Congregation of the UK, later rebranded The S&P Sephardi Community. Rabbi Dweck was elected with a 270–4 vote, a margin believed to be the largest in UK synagogue history. On Sunday, 24 September 2014, Rabbi Dweck was officially installed as Senior Rabbi at the community's cathedral synagogue, Bevis Marks. The Jewish Chronicle reported that:"Religious leaders from across the Anglo-Jewish spectrum, from Liberals to Lubavitch, came to celebrate the arrival of the fresh-faced new leader, aged just 39, at the community's oldest congregation. Dayanim from the Federation and United Synagogue and a large contingent from independent Sephardi communities attended, as well as Emeritus Chief Rabbi Lord Jonathan Sacks, who took part in the ceremony."In his inaugural address Rabbi Dweck said:"The most precious element of [The S&P's] history are the ideas and the thinking that came from my predecessors because of their commitments not only to Jewish life, observance and continuity but also because they taught our Torah within a relevant and rational framework. This trend of traditional observance, coupled with immersion in the world and society, is the crowning glory of our Sephardi tradition."He went on to say that Judaism should be available to the community in 'High Definition’.As Head of S&P, Rabbi Dweck's responsibilities include:

 Oversight of the religious functions of the various member synagogues
 Setting the strategic and spiritual vision for the community
 Overseeing the Sephardi Bet Din
 Spiritual Head of The Sephardi Kashrut Authority (SKA) 
 Ambassador and Spokesperson for the community at various national and international forums
 Interacting with Jewish students on university campuses across the UK

Annual Scholar-In-Residence with the Sephardic Community Alliance

Despite no longer living in the United States, Rabbi Dweck has maintained a close and warm relationship with the Sephardic Community Alliance. He participates in many of their programs and is an especially popular Scholar-in-Residence during their annual summer programming for the Syrian community in Deal, New Jersey.

Honorary roles

In his capacity as Senior Rabbi, Rabbi Dweck has the honor of serving as the Deputy President of the London School of Jewish Studies; a President of The Council of Christians and Jews along with the Chief Rabbi Ephraim Mirvis, The Archbishop of Canterbury and other religious heads; and Ecclesiastical Authority of The Board of Deputies of British Jews. Rabbi Dweck also serves as a member of the Standing Committee of the Conference of European Rabbis.

In 2015, the Jewish News in conjunction with the Jewish Leadership Council published '40 Under 40', listing young members of the British Jewish Community at the forefront of Jewish life, with Rabbi Dweck listed 4th among the top 10.

 Online presence 
Rabbi Dweck is also known for his online presence, reaching audiences around the globe by offering regular content on his mobile app, blog, and social media pages:

 RJD mobile app
 Rabbi Dweck's blog
 Rabbi Dweck's YouTube channel
 Rabbi Dweck's Instagram page 
 Rabbi Dweck's Facebook page

Controversy
In May 2017, Rabbi Dweck gave a lecture in London as part of his Perspectives'' series in Hendon, in which he presented his approach regarding the Torah view on homosexual love, declaring that Jewish law does not legislate against the feelings involved (sexual relations, he stated, are prohibited by the Torah). He suggested that contemporary developments on this issue, while problematic, are also "a fantastic development to humanity" as they force humanity to rethink the question of love, and potentially remove the stigma associated with platonic love and affection between men. He preceded his words with caveats and stated his awareness of the controversial nature of the topic, explaining that he had been thinking about it for years and felt the need to discuss it because "no one was talking about it openly in Orthodox Judaism." This lecture proved highly controversial and while some welcomed and supported it, others strongly rejected it, including Rabbi Aharon Bassous and the Beth Din of the prominent Haredi Rabbi Nissim Karelitz.

Rabbi Dweck issued a clarification letter explaining his Halakhic stance and intentions. Some of his many audio and video lectures were dissected by his rabbinic detractors, and more seemingly controversial opinions of his were criticised.

Consequently, in July 2017, an agreement was achieved, led by British Chief Rabbi Ephraim Mirvis, together with Dayan Chanoch Ehrentreu (Av Beth Din of Europe), Dayan Menachem Gelly (Rosh Beth Din of The London Beth Din), and Dayan Avraham David (Rosh Beth Din of the Sephardi Beth Din), who questioned Rabbi Dweck on his statements and teachings, and concluded that he continue his role as the Senior Rabbi of the Sephardi community. Rabbi Dweck agreed to step down from the Jewish legal position of a Judge (Dayan) of the Sephardi Beth Din. However, as Senior Rabbi, Rabbi Dweck maintains oversight of the Beth Din and appoints its dayyanim. In addition, his future public lectures that presented innovative approaches were to be subjected to rabbinic review, for a time.

The former British Chief Rabbi, Lord Jonathan Sacks, publicly expressed his support for Rabbi Dweck.

In January 2018, Rabbi Dweck resumed his lectures with a new series at the London Jewish School of Studies, at a sold-out return to Hendon.

See also
Spanish and Portuguese Jews
Chief Rabbis of the British Empire and Commonwealth

References

British Orthodox rabbis
Living people
American Orthodox rabbis
1975 births
People from Los Angeles
Alumni of Middlesex University
21st-century American Jews